Westecunk Creek is an  tributary of Little Egg Harbor in southeastern New Jersey in the United States.

The name is derived from Lenape, meaning "place of fat meat."

Westecunk Creek originates in the Pine Barrens.  Its mouth in West Creek(Eagleswood Township) is a few miles north of Tuckerton.

Tributaries
 Uriah Branch
 Log Swamp Branch
 Governors Branch

See also
List of rivers of New Jersey

References

External links
 U.S. Geological Survey: NJ stream gaging stations

Rivers of New Jersey
Rivers in the Pine Barrens (New Jersey)
Rivers of Ocean County, New Jersey